Kalama tricornis, the gorse lacebug, is a species of lace bug in the family Tingidae.

References

Further reading

External links

 

Tingidae
Articles created by Qbugbot
Insects described in 1801